The 116th New York State Legislature, consisting of the New York State Senate and the New York State Assembly, met from January 3 to April 20, 1893, during the second year of Roswell P. Flower's governorship, in Albany.

Background
Under the provisions of the New York Constitution of 1846, 32 Senators and 128 assemblymen were elected in single-seat districts; senators for a two-year term, assemblymen for a one-year term. The senatorial districts were made up of entire counties, except New York County (seven districts) and Kings County (three districts). The Assembly districts were made up of entire towns, or city wards, forming a contiguous area, all within the same county.

On April 26, 1892, the Legislature re-apportioned the Senate Districts and the number of assemblymen per county. Cattaraugus, Cayuga, Chautauqua, Jefferson, Niagara, Oneida, Oswego, Otsego, Saratoga, Ulster, Washington and Wayne counties lost one seat each; St. Lawrence County lost two seats; Erie and Queens counties gained one seat each; and Kings and New York counties gained six seats each.

At this time there were two major political parties: the Democratic Party and the Republican Party. The Prohibition Party, the Socialist Labor Party and a "People's Party" also nominated tickets.

Elections
The New York state election, 1892 was held on November 8. The only statewide elective offices up for election was carried by Charles Andrews, a Republican who was endorsed by the Democrats. The approximate party strength at this election, as expressed by the vote for Chief Judge of the Court of Appeals, was: Republican/Democratic 1,253,000; Prohibition 39,000; Socialist Labor 18,000; and People's Party 17,000.

Sessions
The Legislature met for the regular session at the State Capitol in Albany on January 3, 1893; and adjourned on April 20.

William Sulzer (D) was elected Speaker with 71 votes against 52 for George R. Malby (R).

On January 17, the Legislature elected Edward Murphy, Jr. (D) to succeed Frank Hiscock (R) as U.S. Senator from New York, for a six-year term beginning on March 4, 1893.

On January 27, the Legislature passed "An Act to amend chapter 398, of the Laws of 1892, entitled 'An Act to provide for a convention to revise and amend the Constitution'", calling a Constitutional Convention to meet in 1894.

State Senate

Districts
Note: The Senators in the 116th Legislature had been elected in November 1891 for a two-year term under the apportionment of 1879, as listed below. Although the 115th Legislature (1892) had re-apportioned the Senate districts, the only election under the new apportionment was held in November 1893, to elect the senators who sat in the 117th and 118th Legislatures.

Note: There are now 62 counties in the State of New York. The counties which are not mentioned in this list had not yet been established, or sufficiently organized, the area being included in one or more of the abovementioned counties.

Members
The asterisk (*) denotes members of the previous Legislature who continued in office as members of this Legislature.

Note: For brevity, the chairmanships omit the words "...the Committee on (the)..."

Employees
 Clerk: Charles T. Dunning
 Sergeant-at-Arms: Adelbert E. Tallmadge
 Doorkeeper: Joseph Jerge
 Stenographer: James M. Ruso
 Assistant Clerk: Charles W. Sutherland
 Librarian: James Oliver

State Assembly

Assemblymen

The asterisk (*) denotes members of the previous Legislature who continued as members of this Legislature.

Note: For brevity, the chairmanships omit the words "...the Committee on (the)..."

Employees
 Clerk: Charles R. DeFreest
 Sergeant-at-Arms: Michael B. Redmond
 Doorkeeper: Edward A. Moore
 Stenographer: Thomas Hassett

Notes

Sources
 The New York Red Book compiled by Edgar L. Murlin (published by James B. Lyon, Albany NY, 1897; see pg. 384f for senate districts; pg. 404 for senators; pg. 410–417 for Assembly districts; and pg. 510 for assemblymen)
 New York State Legislative Souvenir for 1893 with Portraits of the Members of Both Houses by Henry P. Phelps
 MOVED LIKE CLOCKWORK in The New York Times on January 3, 1893

116
1893 in New York (state)
1893 U.S. legislative sessions